Demonic is the seventh studio album by American thrash metal band Testament. Released in 1997 with original members Chuck Billy (vocals) and Eric Peterson (guitar), the record also features artists Derrick Ramirez (bass), Gene Hoglan (drums) and Glen Alvelais (guitar). Ramirez was previously the band's first guitarist (although here he is performing on bass guitar), and Alvelais had previously performed with Testament on the 1993 live album, Return to the Apocalyptic City. Demonic was also Testament's only album with Hoglan for 15 years, until he rejoined and performed on the album Dark Roots of Earth (2012).

Musically and lyrically, this album is very different from anything Testament had released before, marking a deviation from previous albums to a much darker death metal sound mirroring the album's exorcism theme. Songs like "John Doe" and "Hatred's Rise" stand out in reviews as examples noting the overall heavier change.

Artwork 
The album cover art for Demonic was done by Dave McKean who also did the cover art for the prior Testament studio album, Low and would go on to do their next, The Gathering. In a 1999 interview while supporting the release of The Gathering, Peterson described how the image depicts a type of African exorcism where a wooden mask is made to represent the possessed victim. Nails are then driven into it cleansing the afflicted person of the evil spirit.

McKean gets double duty from the cover's pentagram graphic using the style depiction from the Legacy (band) logo, the band name Testament released a 1985 demo under, as both a nod to longtime fans and as the spirit being driven forth. The center skull art without the pentagram enclosure can be seen on the album cover of Testament's first studio album, The Legacy.

Re-release 
The album was reissued on January 8, 2018 under license from Burnt Offerings via label Prosthetic, featuring new cover artwork.

Track listing

Personnel

Testament
 Chuck Billy – vocals
 Eric Peterson – lead and rhythm guitars
 Derrick Ramirez – bass
 Gene Hoglan – drums
 Glen Alvelais – lead guitars on track 9

Production and design
Chuck Billy – co-producer
Eric Peterson – co-producer
Douglas Hall – co-producer, engineer
Michael Wagener – mixing (2008)
Mauricio Acevedo – engineer (assistant)
George Marino – mastering
Dave McKean – album cover artwork 
Walter Morgan – photography (band photo)

References

Testament (band) albums
1997 albums
Albums with cover art by Dave McKean
Death metal albums by American artists
Groove metal albums